Veronica Alexandra Tecaru (born January 14, 1984), known by her stage name Veronika, is a Romanian singer. Born in Galați, Tecaru turned to singing after giving up a career as a basketball player. She began her music career in Bucharest as a member of Wassabi in 2006. Following the disbandment of Wassabi in 2009, Tecaru pursued a solo career under the name Veronika. Associated acts include Brad Vee Johnson (national tour) and Julian M (2011-2012).

References

External links 
 Veronika at Facebook 
 Veronika at Media Pro Music 
 
1984 births 
21st-century Romanian singers
Romanian rhythm and blues singers
Romanian soul singers
Romanian dance musicians
Romanian electronic musicians 
Romanian hip hop musicians
Romanian people of Ivorian descent 
Living people 
People from Galați
Women hip hop musicians
Hip hop singers